Ferry Point Park is a  park in the Bronx, New York City. The park site is a peninsula projecting into the East River roughly opposite the College Point and Malba neighborhoods of Queens. The park is located on the eastern shore of Westchester Creek, adjacent to the neighborhood of Throggs Neck. The park is operated by the New York City Department of Parks and Recreation. The Hutchinson River Expressway (Interstate 678) crosses the park to the Bronx-Whitestone Bridge, splitting it into east and west sides.

The east side of the park has a golf course called Trump Ferry Point, a community park, and a waterfront promenade. The east side borders are Saint Raymond's Cemetery; Balcom Avenue, Miles Avenue and Emerson Avenue; and the East River and the Bronx-Whitestone Bridge.

The west side is heavily used for soccer, cricket, fishing and barbecues. Friends of Ferry Point Park holds cleanup events, plantings and helps care for the 3,000 trees planted in the park as the Ferry Point 9/11 Memorial Grove and 9/11 Living Memorial Forest. These trees were donated by the Prince of Monaco.

History

Ferry Point is named after the Ferris family, who were 18th-century residents of Throggs Neck. By the 19th century, the area had developed into a fashionable public summer resort, which also contained large German beer gardens, to which the residents of Yorkville, Manhattan (then a heavily German neighborhood) arrived by steamboat service up the East River. The 19th-century steamboat landing at Ferris Dock on Westchester Creek stood at present-day Brush Avenue north of Wenner Place; the road to it bore the name of the steamboat Osseo. 

The first house to be built in the Bronx was reportedly the Charlton Ferris House, built in 1687 along Ferris Avenue between Wenner Place, Brush Avenue and Lafayette Avenue. It was situated on the estate of Albert L. Lovenstein. Several other large and handsome 18th-century Ferris houses were built in the neighborhood, of which two lasted until the 1960s.

Commac Street was nearby and parallel to Osseo and later demapped as well. The city sold this 6 acres to be developed and it had become a truck parking facility as of 2012. Wenner Place terminated at Westchester Creek and for many generations was used as a boat launch. New York City cut off the access to this Creek as it sold off the waterfront to developers. Neighbors are advocating for a boat launch at the nearby east side of this park and a kayak launch on the west side.

In 1937, New York City acquired the land for Ferry Point Park in preparation for the construction of the Bronx-Whitestone Bridge. The land had belonged to the Roman Catholic House of the Good Shepherd. The original  parcel was called 'Old Ferry' and was located at the confluence of the Westchester Creek and the Baxter Creek Inlet. Baxter Creek later became the East side of the park when it was filled in by landfill. In the 1930s, New York City Parks Commissioner Robert Moses planned a beach, bathhouse, cafeteria complex, bus terminal and parking field for the site, but none were ever built. The landscaped west-side parkland was opened to the public in 1940.

In 1948,  were added to the park by condemnation, bringing it to its current land area. The west side of the park was well utilized by churches, schools, and visitors from Parkchester, Castle Hill and Throggs Neck apartments. The east side underwent years of raw garbage Landfill under the authority of the Department of Sanitation (began in 1952 and continued until 1970).

Early 2000s plans for revitalizing Ferry Point Park included an 18-hole golf course and an adjacent community park and waterfront promenade were developed by the New York City Department of Parks and Recreation. The adjacent parks were design by Thomas Balsley Associates and the golf course was designed by Jack Nicklaus in collaboration with John Sanford. Laws Construction built the community park, which opened in 2012, and the golf course, which opened in 2015. The Trump Organization received the city's concessionaire contract to grow-in and maintain the golf course and run the general golf operations. In early 2021, New York City mayor Bill de Blasio announced that the city government would be severing all contracts with the Trump Organization, including Ferry Point's golf course, citing Trump's involvement in the previous week's storming of the United States Capitol.

Facilities
The east side of Ferry Point Park is equipped with sports fields, basketball and handball courts. The west side has barbecue areas, 8 soccer fields, 2 cricket fields and the 9/11 Living Memorial Forest and Hilltop Grove.

The community park includes a baseball field, basketball court, playground, trails and comfort station. The proposed waterfront promenade plans include comfort station, picnic areas, trails and the ecological revitalization of the waterfront on the east side near the East River Crescent area. Part of the park has no running water or restrooms.

Transportation
The New York City Bus-operated Q44 and the MTA Bus-operated Q50 bus lines stop near Ferry Point Park. Additionally, the park is accessible from the Bronx–Whitestone Bridge. On 28 December 2021 the Soundview Ferry line of NYC Ferry began service to Ferry point.

References

Parks in the Bronx
East River
Throggs Neck, Bronx